Kaili may refer to:

Place name 
 Kaili City, city in Guizhou, China
 The Kaili Formation, noted for its soft-bodied fossils

Persons 
 Kaylee, or Kaili, female given name
 Kaili Lukan (born 1994), Canadian rugby sevens player
 Kaili Närep (born 1970), Estonian actress
 Kaili Sirge (born 1983), Estonian cross-country skier
 Eva Kaili (born 1978), Greek politician

Other 
 Kaili languages, subdivision of the Malayo-Polynesian family spoken in Sulawesi, Indonesia

Estonian feminine given names